The 61st Fighter Wing (61 FW) is a disbanded unit of the United States Air Force, last stationed at Hayward Municipal Airport, Hayward, California. It was withdrawn from the California Air National Guard (CA ANG) and inactivated on 31 October 1950.

This wing is not related to the 61st Troop Carrier Wing, Medium, or subsequent units that was constituted and activated on 1 July 1948.

History

World War II
The wing was a World War II command and control organization for Army Air Bases training replacement personnel being assigned to troop carrier groups and glider units in the overseas combat theaters. Inactivated at the end of the war.

Air National Guard
Allocated to the California Air National Guard for command and control origination for units in the Western Region (Northern California, Nevada, Utah) of the United States.  Extended federal recognition and activated on 4 April 1948

At the end of October 1950, the Air National Guard converted to the wing-base (Hobson Plan) organization. As a result, the wing was withdrawn from the California ANG and was inactivated on 31 October 1950.  The 144th Fighter Wing was established by the National Guard Bureau, allocated to the state of California, recognized and activated 1 November 1950; assuming the personnel, equipment and mission of the inactivated 61st Fighter Wing.

Lineage
 Constituted as 61st Fighter Wing on 5 June 1943
 Activated on 13 June 1943
 Inactivated on 4 October 1945
 Allotted to the California ANG on 24 May 1946
 Extended federal recognition and activated on 4 April 1948
 Inactivated, and returned to the control of the Department of the Air Force, on 31 October 1950
 Disbanded on 15 June 1983

Assignments
 I Troop Carrier Command, 13 June 1943 – 4 October 1945
 California Air National Guard, 4 April 1948 – 31 October 1950

Components
 144th Fighter Group, 2 June 1948 – 31 October 1950

Stations
 Pope Field, North Carolina, 13 June 1943
 Sedalia Army Airfield, Missouri, July 1943-4 October 1945
 Hayward Municipal Airport, Hayward, California, 4 April 1948 – 31 October 1950

References

 Maurer, Maurer (1983). Air Force Combat Units of World War II. Maxwell AFB, Alabama: Office of Air Force History. .

0061
061
Military units and formations disestablished in 1950
061